The 2014 NASCAR Canadian Tire Series season was the eighth season of the NASCAR Canadian Tire Series, which took place in the summer of 2014. The season consisted of 11 races at 10 different venues, of which 7 were held on ovals. It began with the Pinty's presents the Clarington 200 at Canadian Tire Motorsport Park on May 18 and ended with the Pinty's 250 at Kawartha Speedway on September 20. Scott Steckly entered the season as the defending Drivers' Champion.

Louis-Philippe Dumoulin won his first series championship at Kawartha Speedway, finishing three points ahead of J. R. Fitzpatrick. Dumoulin won two races during the season, at Saskatoon and Trois-Rivières, and finished every race inside the top nine placings; this run included nine top-five finishes. Fitzpatrick won one more race than Dumoulin – winning both Canadian Tire Motorsport Park races, as well as the Kawartha finale – but only recorded three further top-five finishes. Despite not winning a race, D. J. Kennington finished third in the championship, eight points ahead of defending champion Steckly, who won at Saint-Eustache.

Three other drivers won races during the season, including Jason Hathaway and Andrew Ranger, who each won two races; Hathaway won the series' inaugural race at the quarter-mile Autodrome Chaudière as well as winning at Barrie Speedway, while Ranger won back-to-back races at ICAR and Edmonton International Raceway, another new venue to the 2014 schedule. The season's other winner was Donald Chisholm, who only contested two races during the year. Chisholm was the winner at Riverside International Speedway, a track that his father owned until his death in July 2014; it was his maiden series victory.

Drivers

Schedule

Notes

Results and standings

Races

Drivers' championship

(key) Bold - Pole position awarded by time. Italics - Pole position set by final practice results or rainout. * – Most laps led.

Notes
1 – Simon Dion-Viens received championship points, despite the fact that he did not qualify for the race.

See also

2014 NASCAR Sprint Cup Series
2014 NASCAR Nationwide Series
2014 NASCAR Camping World Truck Series
2014 NASCAR K&N Pro Series East
2014 NASCAR K&N Pro Series West
2014 NASCAR Whelen Modified Tour
2014 NASCAR Whelen Southern Modified Tour
2014 NASCAR Toyota Series
2014 NASCAR Whelen Euro Series

References

External links

Canadian Tire Series Standings and Statistics for 2014

NASCAR Canadian Tire Series

NASCAR Pinty's Series